The Alcorn State Lady Braves basketball team is the women's basketball team that represents Alcorn State University in Lorman, Mississippi, United States.  The school's team currently competes in the Southwestern Athletic Conference.

NCAA Division I Tournament appearances

References

External links